Anita, no te rajes (Anita, Don't Give Up!) is a Spanish-language telenovela produced by the American-based television network Telemundo. It stars Jorge Enrique Abello, Ivonne Montero and Natalia Streignard. It was written by Valentina Parraga, directed by David Posada and Gaviria; with Martha Godoy and Mary-Kathryn Kennedy as General Producer and Aurelio Valcárcel Carroll as Executive Producer.  This telenovela was aired in at least 10 countries around the world.

Although the novela was set in Los Angeles, Telemundo filmed the serial in Miami, Fl. Through [sometimes not so] careful editing it was made to appear as Los Angeles.  The network debuted it on September 14, 2004 to April 4, 2005 at the 7 pm (6 pm central) timeslot. Telemundo added English subtitles as closed captions on CC3.

Plot
¡Anita, no te rajes! is a funny story which tells the adventures of Anita, a positive and happy young Mexican girl who never gave up on everything, following her deceased mother's quote: "Las Guerrero no se rajan" (The Guerreros never give up). Anita decides to come to the US without her documents in order to find her aunt, Consuelo Guerrero, the only surviving member of her family.

Consuelo married an important contractor of Irish origins and she is heiress to a huge fortune.

Cast
Jorge Enrique Abello as Eduardo Jose Contreras - main hero, in love with Anita, spouse of Ariana, son of Emiliano
 Ivonne Montero as Ana 'Anita' Guerrero - main heroine, daughter of Graciela, in love with Eduardo
 Natalia Streignard as Ariana Dupont Aristizábal - main female villain, wife of Eduardo, hates Anita
 Marcelo Cezán as David Aristizábal - cousin of Anita, in love with Anita and then with Lucecita
 Elluz Peraza as Consuelo Guerrero / Graciela O'Donnell - mother of Anita and Billy, stepmother of Maggie
 Eduardo Serrano as Emiliano Contreras - father of Eduardo, in love with Graciela
 Isabel Moreno as Cachita Moret - grandmother of Lucecita, ex-friend of Amanda
 Jeannette Lehr as Carlota Aristizábal de Dupont - mother of Ariana, villain, then she goes crazy
 Martha Picanes as Amanda Aristizábal - grandmother of Anita and David, aunt of Ariana, villain, then hero
 Roberto Moll as Abelardo Reyes - father of David, in love with Dulce
 Laura Termini as Maggie O`Donnell - daughter of Tom, hates Anita, half sister of Billy
 Christian Tapán as Padre Francisco - friend of Eduardo
 Giovan Ramos as Ramiro Albornoz - villain, father of the child of Ariana, killed by Ariana
 Alexa Kuve as Dulce Maria Contreras - sister of Eduardo, in love with Abelardo
 Millie Ruperto as Ambar Barros - mother of Angie, in love with Memo
 Andrea Loreto as Angie Barros - daughter of Ambar
 Ruben Camelo as Roque Izquierdo - father of Guadalupe and husband of Nati Izquierdo
 Jana Martinez as Nati Izquierdo - mother of Guadalupe and wife of Roque Izquierdo
 Kenia Gazcon as Guadalupe Izquierdo - daughter of Nati and Roque, in love with Chucho
 Yadira Santana as Mercedes - maid of family Contreras
 Michelle Manterola as Lucecita - best friend of Anita, granddaughter of Cachita, in love with David
 Yaxkin Santalucia as El Chucho - in love with Guadalupe
 Sabas Malaver as Memo Valiente - in love with Ambar
 Jorge Alberti as El Fresa
 Gabriel Parisi as Billy O`Donnell - son of Tom and Graciela
 Daniel Fabius as Tom O`Donnell - spouse of Graciela, dies in a car accident
 Martha Mijares as Zilfides Delgado The Judge

References

External links
 

2004 telenovelas
2004 American television series debuts
2005 American television series endings
Spanish-language American telenovelas
Telemundo telenovelas
Television series by Universal Television
Television shows set in Los Angeles